Eaglecrest High School is a public high school located in unincorporated Arapahoe County, Colorado, near the cities of Aurora and Centennial. Eaglecrest was the fourth high school to open in the Cherry Creek School District, and it is a member of the 5A Centennial League. The school initially opened serving grades 7–10, and subsequently transitioned to a traditional 9–12 high school.

Academics 
Eaglecrest holds Advanced Placement courses for its students.

Eaglecrest High School is the American Association of School Librarians' 2014 National School Library Program of the Year Award recipient.

Demographics
The demographic breakdown of the 2,822 students enrolled in 2017–18 was:
Male - 51.5%
Female - 48.5%
Native American/Alaskan - 0.6%
Asian/Pacific islanders - 5.6%
Black - 13.6%
Hispanic - 22.4%
White - 50.3%
Multiracial - 7.3%

31.5% of the students were eligible for free or reduced lunch.

Athletics 

The Eaglecrest Raptors compete in the Centennial League along with the Smoky Hill Buffaloes, Overland Trailblazers, Arapahoe Warriors, Cherry Creek Bruins, Cherokee Trail Cougars, Mullen Mustangs, and Grandview Wolves.

Eaglecrest has won a total of 15 State Championships since 1991, the latest of which was the title for Basketball in 2018.

Cheerleading – State champions (1994, 1995, 1997, 1998, 1999, 2001, 2003, 2008, 2015, 2019, 2021);UCA National High School Cheerleading Championship (NHSCC) 2nd Runner-up (2019), National Champions (2020), 1st Runner-up (2022)
Football – State champions (1993)
Track & field – State champions (2002)
Softball – State champions (2005)
Volleyball – 5A State champions (2006)
Boys' basketball – State champions (2013, 2017)

Notable people
Jordyn Poulter, U.S. Olympic gold medalist and professional volleyball player

References

Public high schools in Colorado
Education in Aurora, Colorado
Cherry Creek School District
Schools in Arapahoe County, Colorado
Educational institutions established in 1991
1991 establishments in Colorado